aussieBum is an Australian men's swimwear and underwear manufacturer. Initially manufactured in Sydney's inner west, a growing number of aussieBum products were later manufactured overseas in China, Bangladesh, Thailand, and Vietnam. Their products are designed and delivered from Sydney, with the business run out of the company's headquarters in the suburb of Leichhardt.

Marketing
The company has no sales representatives overseas, and instead promotes with its company website. Australian sales make up 10% of its business. The company has a broad reach for a business run entirely via the Web, with no shop front and minimal packing staff.

The brand retails in large department stores around the world, such as Selfridges, Harrods and House of Fraser in the UK, Printemps in Paris, KaDeWe in Berlin, and Harvey Nichols in Dubai, as well as in small boutiques in various cities around the world. aussieBum's online store ships to more than 150 countries.

AussieBum promotes its products on various social media platforms such as Facebook and Twitter. The brand has a popular online following with the aussieBum being the 7th most popular search term in Australia as of April 2008.

The brand uses a distinctly cheeky advertising style, such as remaking the Australian painting Shearing the Rams with muscle-bound men shearing sheep in just their underwear.

AussieBum swimwear has been featured in music video clips Slow by Kylie Minogue and SuperMartXé VIP.

In 2011, during the first episode of The Celebrity Apprentice Australia, director Sean Ashby gave $50,000 to charity when politician Pauline Hanson washed his car wearing aussieBum underwear, plus an additional $10,000 for Deni Hines to sing the national anthem.

Products

Wonderjock
In November 2006, the Wonderjock was launched in the aussieBum underwear lines. Wonderjocks have been designed to lift and enhance a man's "package", through the use of a fabric cup used to protrude everything out instead of just down. 50,000 pairs of the new underwear were sold in the first seven days of being released.

See also

List of swimwear brands
Speedo (suit style)

References

Clothing brands of Australia
Swimwear manufacturers
Swimwear brands
Underwear brands
Sportswear brands
Surfwear brands
Manufacturing companies based in Sydney
Retail companies established in 2001
Australian companies established in 2001
Clothing companies established in 2001